is a 1959 Japanese comedy film co-written and directed by Yasujirō Ozu. It is a loose remake of his own 1932 silent film I Was Born, But..., and is Ozu's second film in color.

Plot
The film takes place in suburban Tokyo, and begins with a group of boy students going home.

The film steers into a subplot concerning the local women's club monthly dues.  Everyone in the neighborhood club believes that Mrs Hayashi, the treasurer, has given the dues to the chairwoman, Mrs Haraguchi, but Mrs Haraguchi denies it.  They gossip amongst themselves who could have taken the money, and speculate that Mrs Haraguchi could have used the money to buy for herself a new washing machine.  Later Mrs Haraguchi confronts Mrs Hayashi for starting the rumor and ruining her reputation, but Mrs Hayashi states that she has indeed handed the dues money to Haraguchi's mother.  Only later does Mrs Haraguchi realize it was her mistake (her mother being quite senile and forgetful), and she goes to apologize.

The boys are all attracted to a neighbor's house because they have a television set, where they can watch their favorite sumo wrestling matches.  (At the time of the film's release in Japan, the medium was rapidly gaining popularity.)  However, their conservative parents forbid them to visit their bohemian neighbors because the wife is thought to be a cabaret singer.

As a result of this, the young boys of the Hayashi family, Minoru and Isamu, pressure their mother to buy them a television set, but their mother refuses.  When their father learns of it, he asks the boys to keep quiet when they kick a tantrum.  Minoru throws an anger fit, and states that adults always engage in pointless niceties like "good morning" and refuse to say exactly what they mean.  Back in their room, Minoru and Isamu decide on a silence strike against all adults.  The first neighbor to bear the brunt of this snub is Mrs Haraguchi.

Mrs Haraguchi, angered by this snub, speculates it is Mrs Hayashi who instigates this in revenge over their earlier misunderstanding, and tells this to busybody Mrs. Tomizawa.  Soon, everybody thinks Mrs Hayashi is a petty, vengeful person, and are all queueing up to return their loaned items to her.

Minoru and Isamu continue their strike in school, and even against their English tutor.  Finally, their schoolteacher visits to find the root of their silence.  The two boys run off from home with a pot of rice due to hunger, but are caught by a passing policeman.  They disappear for hours into the evening, until their English tutor finds them outside a station watching television.

At the end of the film, the boys find out their parents have indeed purchased a television set to support a neighbour in his new job as a salesman.  Jubilant, they stop their strike at once.  Their English tutor and their aunt appear to be starting a fresh romance.

Cast 

 Keiji Sada as Heiichiro Fukui
 Yoshiko Kuga as Setsuko Arita
 Chishū Ryū as Keitaro Hayashi
 Kuniko Miyake as Tamiko Hayashi
 Haruko Sugimura as Kikue Haraguchi
 Shitara Koji as Minoru Hayashi
 Masahiko Shimazu as Isamu Hayashi
 Kyoko Izumi as Midori Maruyama
 Taiji Tonoyama as the door-to-door salesman

Style
Despite Ozu's reputation in the West as an austere and refined director, Good Morning does not shy away from depicting many of the neighborhood boys' flatulence jokes.

Reception
Good Morning has an 88% approval rating on Rotten Tomatoes. Richard Brody of The New Yorker wrote about the film "Yasujiro Ozu’s poised images convey a bitterly ironic, scathingly radical rejection of Japanese codes of self-restraint and silence." Jonathan Rosenbaum of Chicago Reader praised the film describing it as "Perhaps the most delightful of Yasujiro Ozu's late comedies". In 2009 the film was ranked at No. 36 on the list of the Greatest Japanese Films of All Time by Japanese film magazine kinema Junpo.

Home media
In 2011, the BFI released a Region 2 Dual Format Edition (Blu-ray + DVD). Included with this release is a standard definition presentation of I Was Born, But....

In 2017, Criterion re-released Good Morning in a Region 1 Blu-ray. The film received a 4k digital restoration for this release and is packaged alongside I Was Born, But... and a fragment of A Straightforward Boy.

References

External links

 
Good Morning an essay by Rick Prelinger at the Criterion Collection
DVD review of Good Morning
 
Review at The Factual Opinion

1959 films
1959 comedy-drama films
1950s Japanese-language films
Japanese comedy-drama films
Remakes of Japanese films
Sound film remakes of silent films
Films directed by Yasujirō Ozu
Films with screenplays by Yasujirō Ozu
Films with screenplays by Kogo Noda
Shochiku films
1959 comedy films
1959 drama films
1950s Japanese films